Samsung GT-M7500 (known as Samsung Emporio Armani "Night Effect") is a candybar phone that was announced in January 2009. One of the key selling points of the handset was the user-selectable lighting effects that it came with, plus prominent Emporio Armani branding. As of January 2014, this is the only official Emporio Armani handset products, although Samsung have produced Giorgio Armani branded handsets such as a special edition of the Samsung Galaxy S.

Features
 Screen size: 2.2 inch OLED screen
 Resolution: 240 x 320 pixels
 Phone dimensions: 114.9 x 47.4 x 12 mm
 Weight: 90.2g
 Standby Time: Up to 290hrs
 Talk Time: Up to 4hrs 20mins
 120mb internal memory
 3-megapixel camera
 3.5mm headphone jack
 3G (HSDPA), EDGE, GPRS, and HSCSD
 Dedicated music keys
 FM radio with RDS
 Messaging: SMS, MMS, Email
 microSD Card Slot (TransFlash)

See also
Samsung P520 Giorgio Armani

References

External links
 Samsung Emporio Armani - Samsung official website

M7500
Portable media players
Mobile phones introduced in 2009